Hiram may refer to:

People
 Hiram (name)

Places
 Hiram, Georgia
 Hiram High School, Hiram, Georgia 
 Hiram, Maine
 Hiram, Missouri
 Hiram, Ohio
 Hiram College, a private liberal arts college located in Hiram, Ohio
Hiram Terriers, the school's sports teams
 Hiram, Texas
 Hiram, West Virginia
 Hiram Township, Cass County, Minnesota

Other uses
 Hiram (TV series), a TV drama series in the Philippines
 Hiram's Highway, a road in Hong Kong
 Hiram House, one of the first settlement houses in the United States
 Hiram Masonic Lodge No. 7, a gothic revival building in Franklin, Tennessee; also the oldest masonic lodge in Tennessee
 Operation Hiram, a three-day military operation in the Upper Galilee launched by the Israeli army at the end of October 1948

See also
 
 
 Hyrum (disambiguation)